The Oakland Golden Grizzlies men's basketball statistical leaders are individual statistical leaders of the Oakland Golden Grizzlies men's basketball program in various categories, including points, assists, blocks, rebounds, and steals. Within those areas, the lists identify single-game, single-season, and career leaders. The Golden Grizzlies represent Oakland University in the National Collegiate Athletic Association's (NCAA) Horizon League.

Oakland began competing in intercollegiate basketball in 1967.  The NCAA did not officially record assists as a stat until the 1983–84 season, and blocks and steals until the 1985–86 season, but Oakland's record books includes players in these stats before these seasons.

These lists are through the 2022–23 season.

Current players are listed in bold.

Scoring

Rebounds

Assists

Steals

Blocks

Field goal percentage

Free throw percentage

Three point field goal percentage

Games played

Footnotes
 The official Oakland record book lists Reggie Hamilton in third place with 548 career assists from 2010–2012. That includes the assists he accumulated while at UMKC from 2007–2009, which is inconsistent with how the rest of the record book handles transfer player statistics.
 The official Oakland record book lists Marshall's total at 199, but the addition of his individual season's statistics makes the total 198 (80 in 2002–03, 59 in 2003–04, 59 in 2004–05).
 The official Oakland record book lists Felder's 2015–16 point total as 773 while multiple independent sources list the number as 853.
 The official Oakland record book does not list Max Hooper, even though he meets all the requirements to be included on the list.
 The official Oakland record book does not list Felder's 2014–15 season.
 The official Oakland record book lists Felder's 2015–16 assist total as 296.
 The official Oakland record book lists Hooper's 2015–16 three point field goal percentage as 44.9% (105–234).
 The official Oakland record book lists Brechting's single game field goals as 13–14, but has the correct percentage.

References

Lists of college basketball statistical leaders by team
Statistical